Guaratiba is a large neighborhood located in the West Zone of Rio de Janeiro, Brazil. It has one of the city's smallest population densities.

The bairro is in the eastern part of Sepetiba Bay. It contains the  Guaratiba Biological Reserve, a strictly protected conservation unit holding a remnant of mangroves.

The region is currently expanding due to real estate investment because the access to the neighborhood is predisposed to be made easier due to Grota Funda tunnel (pt), scheduled to be finished in 2008.

References 

Neighbourhoods in Rio de Janeiro (city)
Beaches of Rio de Janeiro (city)